Combatants for Peace is an Israeli-Palestinian NGO and an egalitarian, bi-national, grassroots movement committed to non-violent action against the “Israeli occupation and all forms of violence” in Israel and the Palestinian territories.

The movement was formed in 2006 by Palestinians and Israelis who had taken an active role in the cycle of violence, and decided to work together to promote a peaceful solution through non-violent action. Originally, the activists were solely ex-combatants: the Israeli soldiers and refuseniks of the Israeli army and Palestinian fighters. Today, members of the movement include also men and women who have never played a violent role in the conflict. According to their website, Combatants for Peace is the only peace group worldwide, ever that was founded and run by ex-combatants on both sides of an active conflict. Other all other joint veteran-based peace initiatives have been co-founded only after peaceful resolution to their conflict has been achieved.

The documentary film “Disturbing The Peace” was made in 2016 about the work of Combatants For Peace. The movie is being screened throughout Israel, Palestine, the United States and Europe. The movie has won numerous awards internationally including the first ever Ebert Humanitarian Award,

Vision, Mission and Goals

Combatants for Peace describes its main goals as:
 Building an ever-expanding Palestinian-Israeli joint activist community based upon CfP's bi-national regional groups that embody our vision and serve as a model for both societies and their future.
 Motivating broad and effective bi-national, non-violent activity promoting freedom and security for both peoples in their homeland.
 Changing attitudes on a wide scale, both within the Israeli and Palestinian public, as well as with governmental decision makers.

Activities
Combatants for Peace has organized a series of meetings between veterans from both sides, most taking place in East Jerusalem in the early years, but have expanded now into ten local bi-national groups operating between Tulkarm-Tel Aviv, Nablus-Tel Aviv, Ramallah-Tel Aviv, Jerusalem-Jericho, Jerusalem-Bethlehem, Beersheva-Hebron and in the North. Additionally, Combatants for Peace now organizes two region-wide Israeli-Palestinian bi-national groups, a Theater of the Oppressed group and women's group. They also participate in humanitarian aid work, including rebuilding demolished playgrounds, homes, schools and orchards in the West Bank.

Other activities include:
Holding ex-combatants' meetings, allowing each side to tell their own story and understand the other's narrative. 
Holding in-house meetings and educational lectures in public forums on both sides (including at universities, youth groups, schools on both sides, etc.). 
Direct actions and protests against the policy of occupation and its outcomes such as road blockings, house demolitions, limitations on Palestinian farmers and confiscation of land by Israeli settlers.
Organizing joint daytrips and educational tours for Israelis to see the situation in the occupied West Bank.
Solidarity actions such as joint olive harvests and agricultural work, to help Palestinian farmers who have difficulties in working their lands near army posts and Jewish settlements.
Building playgrounds and schools for Palestinian communities, allowing children who live lives mired in violence and fear to also have hope.
Producing special events such as the joint Memorial Day ceremony, allowing both sides to mourn together for the victims of the conflict and to call for an end of the violence.
Providing information and raising public awareness globally through media and international lecture tours.
Building coalitions with other activist groups on the ground in order to have a greater impact and aid those in need. Two notable coalitions have been Sumud Freedom Camp and the Jordan Valley Coalition. Summed Freedom Camp helped to resettle two Palestinian families back on their own land, and the Jordan Valley Coalition seeks to protect Bedouin shepherd and their communities from violence.
Non-Violence Communication Trainings and Non-Violence Activist Trainings for Combatants activists These trainings serve to teach CFP activists how to engage nonviolently when encountering both immediate violent situations and in general, a violent society - and to help transform these interactions into effective nonviolent activism.

Media
Combatants for Peace have been interviewed on CNN, by Democracy Now!, had a front page article in the New York Times,  had several articles featured on the BBC, and were featured in the Huffington Post, the LA Times, Al Jeezera, and the front page of the Jerusalem Post.

Awards
Combatants for Peace has won a series of awards for their nonviolent, joint activism including:
2017 and 2018 Nominee for the Nobel Peace Prize, specifically nominated were two of the co-founders Sulaiman Khatib and Chen Alon
The 2009 Euro-Med Dialogue Award Winner.
The Ben Gurion University Berlson Award.
The Friedrich Siegmund-Schultze award for non-violence.
The Cinema For Peace Award in 2017 
FOR Pfeffer International Peace Award, 2016 
The First Ever Roger Ebert Humanitarian Award, 2016 
Peace Direct: Tomorrow's Peacebuilders Award, 2015 
The Tufts Global Leadership Award, 2015.
The IIE Victor J. Goldberg Prize for Peace in the Middle East, awarded to Bassam Aramin and Avner Wishnitzer, co-founders of Combatants for Peace, 2010.
Courage of Conscience Award from the Peace Abbey, 2009 
The Anna Lindh Euro-Med Award for the Dialogue between Cultures, 2009.
The Livia Foundation Conflict Resolution Award, 2009.
The "Search for Common Ground" Award in 2007.
Honored by the City of Philadelphia, 2006. Combatants for Peace Co-founders, Sulaiman Khatib and Yonatan Shapira honored, on behalf of Combatants for Peace in a resolution by the City Council of Philadelphia.

References

Non-governmental organizations involved in the Israeli–Palestinian peace process
Peace organizations based in Israel